The order of precedence of Greece is fixed by the Decree 52749/2006 of the Minister of the Interior, and prescribes the protocollary hierarchy of the Greek political leadership. The President, as head of state, is first, and the Prime Minister, as head of government, is second.

 President of Greece (Katerina Sakellaropoulou)
 Prime Minister of Greece (Kyriakos Mitsotakis)
 Speaker of the Hellenic Parliament (Konstantinos Tasoulas)
 Archbishop of Athens and All Greece (Ieronymos II)
 Leader of the Official Opposition (Alexis Tsipras)
 Former President(s) of Greece (Prokopis Pavlopoulos)
 Vice President(s) of the Government (Panagiotis Pikrammenos)

Current office-holders

References

Government of Greece
Greece